Blaze of Glory is the third studio album from Bone Thugs-n-Harmony member Flesh-n-Bone. Due to his incarceration, it is his first solo release since 5th Dog Let Loose which was released 11 years prior. Two singles were released, "How I Roll Up" and "Heartaches", and promotional videos were made.

Background
In an interview Flesh-n-Bone said that the album features unreleased group tracks (“Fallin’” and “Can't Take It") which are probably the last times Bone Thugs-n-Harmony will be on the same track, until the untitled 20th anniversary album release in 2012.

Track listing

References

External links
Blaze of Glory at AllMusic

2011 albums
Flesh-n-Bone albums